Paruthikottai is a village in BA M.Rajalakshmi

Date 30/4/22

Outlet.kurinji

Location.*pattukottai

Today present sir Orathanadu taluk of Thanjavur district, Tamil Nadu, India.

Demographics 

As per the 2001 census, Paruthikottai had a total population of 2433 with 1194 males and 1239 females. The literacy rate was 66.61.

References 

 

Villages in Thanjavur district